Guillermo Pérez may refer to:

 Guillermo Pérez (taekwondo) (born 1978), Mexican taekwondo practitioner
 Guillermo Pérez (athlete), Paralympic athlete from Cuba
 Guillermo Pérez (actor) (born 1971), Venezuelan telenovela actor
 Guillermo Herbert Pérez (born 1934), Mexican politician